Muhammad Nurul Huda is a Bangladeshi police officer who served as the 17th Inspector General of Police of Bangladesh Police during 2000–2001. He is a columnist at The Daily Star.

References

Living people
Inspectors General of Police (Bangladesh)
Date of birth missing (living people)
Place of birth missing (living people)
Year of birth missing (living people)